The 1999 Armenian Cup was the eighth edition of the Armenian Cup, a football competition. In 1999, the tournament had 16 participants, out of which only 1 was a reserve team.

Results

First round
The first legs were played on 3 April 1999. The second legs were played on 11 April 1999.

|}

Quarter-finals
The first legs were played on 20 April 1999. The second legs were played on 30 April 1999.

|}

Semi-finals
The first legs were played on 11 May 1999. The second legs were played on 20 May 1999.

|}

Final

See also
 1999 Armenian Premier League

External links
 1999 Armenian Cup at rsssf.com

Armenian Cup seasons
Armenia
Armenian Cup, 1999